"When She Was My Girl" is a 1981 single released by American vocal group the Four Tops. The song, their first release off Casablanca Records, helped to return the former signature Motown act to the American pop Top 40 charts, peaking at number 11 on the US Billboard Hot 100, number 10 on the Cashbox chart, and reaching number one on the R&B charts.

Internationally, it reached number nine in Canada, number six in New Zealand, and also became their first top 10 hit in the UK in nine years, reaching number three. Their top 40 showing made the group one of the few acts to have top 40 singles on the Billboard Hot 100 in three consecutive decades.

Record World called it an "infectious dancer."

"When She Was My Girl" was a Grammy nominee for best R&B song.

Bruce Springsteen recorded the song for his 2022 album, Only the Strong Survive.

Chart performance

Weekly charts

Year-end charts

Certifications

Credits
Lead vocals by Levi Stubbs
Background vocals by Renaldo "Obie" Benson, Abdul "Duke" Fakir and Lawrence Payton

References

External links
 Lyrics of this song
 

1981 songs
1981 singles
Four Tops songs
Songs written by Larry Gottlieb
Torch songs
Casablanca Records singles